Sizov is a Russian masculine surname, its feminine counterpart is Sizova. It may refer to
Alla Sizova (1939–2014), Russian ballet dancer
Gennady Sizov (1941–2021), Soviet and Russian diplomat
Oleg Sizov (born 1963), Russian football player and coach
Oleksandr Sizov (born 1988), Ukrainian basketball player 

Russian-language surnames